Manhattan Square Park, also known as Dr. Martin Luther King Jr. Memorial Park at Manhattan Square, is an urban park located in Downtown Rochester, New York, in the East End District, adjacent to The Strong Museum. The park is open year-round and features an ice skating rink and live music venue.

References

External links
City of Rochester: Dr. Martin Luther King, Jr. Memorial Park

Parks in Monroe County, New York